Pine Grove is an unincorporated community in Cherokee County, located in the U.S. state of Texas. According to the Handbook of Texas, the community had a population of 30 in 2000. It is located within the Tyler-Jacksonville combined statistical area.

History
The area in what is known as Pine Grove today was first settled around the time of the American Civil War and grew up around a local church with the same name. It had a church and several scattered houses in the mid-1930s. Many people left the community after World War II, but it still had a church and several scattered houses, as well as a cemetery and a store in the early 1990s. Its population was 30 in 2000.

Geography

Education
Pine Grove had its own school in 1896 and had 88 students. It was still standing in the mid-1930s and early-1990s. Today, the community is served by the Jacksonville Independent School District.

Notes

Unincorporated communities in Cherokee County, Texas
Unincorporated communities in Texas